Austregésilo de Athayde (September 25, 1898 – September 13, 1993) was a writer and journalist born in Caruaru, Pernambuco, Brazil. His career includes being invited by Assis Chateaubriand to work at a top position at the Diários Associados. Later he became an emblematic figure for the Academia Brasileira de Letras as he served as President of the organization for 34 years.

He was active in human rights causes in Brazil. Austregésilo de Athayde died on September 13, 1993, in Rio de Janeiro at age 94.

External links

Portuguese site
Austregesilo de Athayde recorded at the Library of Congress for the Hispanic Division's audio literary archive on  August 10, 1976.

1898 births
1993 deaths
Brazilian journalists
Members of the Brazilian Academy of Letters
Brazilian male writers
Brazilian people of Portuguese descent
People from Pernambuco
Maria Moors Cabot Prize winners
20th-century journalists